Guan Weinan (born 10 October 1981) is a Chinese ice hockey player. She competed in the women's tournament at the 2002 Winter Olympics.

References

1981 births
Living people
Chinese women's ice hockey players
Olympic ice hockey players of China
Ice hockey players at the 2002 Winter Olympics
Sportspeople from Heilongjiang
Asian Games bronze medalists for China
Medalists at the 2003 Asian Winter Games
Ice hockey players at the 2003 Asian Winter Games
Asian Games medalists in ice hockey
21st-century Chinese women